The American Brewery, located in the Broadway East, Baltimore community, is an historic former brewery located at 1701 North Gay Street in northeast Baltimore, Maryland, United States.  Formerly abandoned and left to decay for four decades, it has been recently repaired, renovated / restored and beautified. It is currently the headquarters of Humanim Inc., a regional social services agency.

History
Built in 1887 by John Frederick Wiessner, a German immigrant, for his Weissner Brewing Company, the Northeast Baltimore brewery was one of the largest breweries in the state of Maryland.  At its peak, the brewery employed 61 workers: 16 in brewery work, 17 drivers, 14 in the bottling house, 8 garage men, and 6 office workers. The central tower of the building housed a 10,000-bushel grain elevator. Prohibition forced the shutdown of the facility in 1920. In 1931 the Wiessner family sold the brewery to the American Malt Company, which modernized the interior equipment and operated the brewery until 1973. The building was listed that year in the National Registry of Historic Sites.

The Brewery has become the new home for Humanim, a Columbia, Maryland, nonprofit organization, secured $22.5 million for renovations of the American Brewery complex into its new headquarters.  The City of Baltimore approved the building permit in early 2004, and work is now complete. The American Brewery is situated in the center of one of East Baltimore's most blighted neighborhoods.

Redevelopment

Struever Bros. Eccles & Rouse, Humanim Inc., and Gotham Development LLC have announced plans to redevelop the Brewhouse building and bottling plant into a social and human services center and a new Baltimore headquarters for Humanim Inc.

The project consists of two phases: the Brewhouse and the Bottle Building. The Brewhouse, a  building that once served as the main brewing facility, will be transformed into Humanim's Baltimore headquarters. Humanim is a 35-year-old Maryland-based social and human services provider that has delivered programs and services in East Baltimore for the last 20 years. The Bottle Building, a  c. 1937 industrial building will be converted into a center for organizations working in community arts, community services and small business development. The Brewhouse is scheduled to start construction in summer 2007 with completion scheduled for the summer 2008. The Bottle Building is scheduled to start construction in 2008 with completion in 2009.

The once-vibrant neighborhood around the brewery building has long been in decline and was largely forgotten by politicians and the media during the latter half of the 20th century. About half of the homes and other buildings in the area have been demolished or are vacant. Basic services such as grocery stores and restaurants have disappeared as well. In 2006, the City of Baltimore moved to acquire 200 abandoned properties in the area for future demolition or rehabilitation.

The rehabilitation of the American Brewery may serve as an impetus for further investment in the East Baltimore neighborhood. Due to its central location in a struggling neighborhood, interior space, and architectural quality, the brewery is seen by urban planners as an anchor for future community and economic development initiatives in the area.  It is hoped that new employment and social services will attract additional investors, improving the quality of life for current and future residents.

References

External links
Baltimore, Maryland, a National Park Service Discover Our Shared Heritage Travel Itinerary
, including undated photo, at Maryland Historical Trust

Incredible Old Photo of the Wiessner Brewery - Ghosts of Baltimore blog

Beer in Maryland
Brewery buildings in the United States
Broadway East, Baltimore
Buildings and structures in Baltimore
German-American culture in Baltimore
Historic American Engineering Record in Baltimore
Industrial buildings and structures on the National Register of Historic Places in Baltimore
Industrial buildings completed in 1887
Towers in Maryland
1887 establishments in Maryland
Baltimore City Landmarks